William Dix (died 1596), of St. Giles, Cripplegate, London and of Wickmere, Norfolk, was an English politician.

He was a Member (MP) of the Parliament of England for New Shoreham in 1571.

References

Year of birth missing
1596 deaths
English MPs 1571
People from North Norfolk (district)
People from the City of London